Stitches is a 1985 American comedy film directed by Rod Holcomb as Alan Smithee and starring Parker Stevenson, Geoffrey Lewis, Eddie Albert and Brian Tochi. It depicts the misadventures of three students in medical school.

Plot
An obnoxious student (Parker Stevenson) and his buddies play obnoxious pranks on women at a school of medicine.

Cast

External links
 
 

1985 films
1985 comedy films
1980s English-language films
American comedy films
Films set in hospitals
Films credited to Alan Smithee
Films directed by Rod Holcomb
1980s American films